Fearless Whispers《 Chinese: 隐秘而伟大 Pinyin: Yǐnmì ér wěidà  Other name: Secret and Great》is a Chinese historical television series, 2020 Best Drama Magnolia Awards finalist, starring Li Yifeng, Gina Jin and Wang LongZheng. It aired on CCTV-8 from 6 November to 1 December 2020.

Synopsis 
After winning the Anti-Japanese War, Gu Yaodong (Li Yifeng), a top-class law graduate from Dongwu University who grew up in a Shanghai alley, became a Criminal Police Officer with the ideal of "Supporting justice and Protecting the people". However, Gu Yaodong, who had just entered the workplace, was not only squeezed and suppressed by his colleagues in the Criminal Investigation Division but also involved in the fierce struggle between the Communist Party’s underground intelligence network and the Kuomintang police. In the chaotic times, Gu Yaodong had to make a choice that was loyal to his beliefs in the confrontation between justice and injustice. In the end, with the help and training of the Shanghai Underground Party, Xia Jicheng (Wang Longzheng) and Shen Qinghe (Gina Jin), he fulfilled his ideals in the journey of revolution and gained precious love.

Cast

Main Cast

Supporting Cast
 Shi Shi   as   Ding Fang
 Wang Xiaoyi   as   Wang Keda
Huang Shuowen   as   Yang Kui
Wang Chao   as   Qi Shengping
Li Qiang   as   Zhong Baiming
Ge Si   as   Li Qishen
Song Jiateng   as   Xiao Derong
He Huan   as   Bao Yimin
Han Yezhou   as   Yu Datong
Zhang Haotian as Inspector Liu
Hou Xuelong as Secretary Fang
Luo Jingmin as Chief Kong
Zhao Chengshun as Boss Dong
Liu Wei as Gu Bangcai, Gu Yaodong's father
Liu Jie as Gu Yaodong's mother
Zhou Zhi as Gu Yuexi, Gu Yaodong's sister
Guo Tangwei as Duo Duo, Gu Yaodong's nephew
Yang Haoyu as Yang Yixue
Zhao Yunzhuo as Yang Fuduo
Hou Changrong as Hu Zhongqi
Fang Zhoubo as Inspector Duan
Zhou Jie as Assistant Chief Tian
Zhou Xiaohai as Chief Tang
Yue Jingwei as Mrs. Qi
Zhang Lan as Zhao Zhiyong's mother 
Zhang Dabao as He Zuxing
Luo Ji as Xu San
Yang Taoge as Secretary Qiu
Zhang Han as Chen Xianmin
Yan Feng as Team Leader Huang
Ren Luomin as Shao Baichen
Zhao Xinhuan as Wen Shaoqun
Li Deliang as Lu Ming
Liu Baixi as Team Leader Cai
Archi as Jack
Yan Zhiping as Shang Rongsheng
Ma Wei as Shang Junyi
Li Shengrong as Ding Naisheng
Zheng Xiaowan as Mother Ding
Zong Xiaojun as Inspector Nan
Li Shuai as Team Leader Hong
Zhu Feng as Wu Liansheng
Wang Kanwei as CEO Huang
Chen Youning as Manager Chen
Lu Xiaolin as Zhou Mingpei
Zheng Liang as Zheng Xin
Leng Haiming as Li Shuzheng
Bi Hanwen as Grocery Stall Owner
Zhao Yucheng as Lady Boss
Jiang Rong as Mrs. Li
Zhu Yuan as Mrs. Xiao
Zhou Zixin as Mrs. Yu
Zhu Liqun as Mrs. Wu
Yu Xiaodong as Mr. Wu
Wang Jian as Son Wu
Zhang Fan as Xiao Wang
He Xiao as Xiao Wang's Wife

Casting 
Wang Wei (director) said that all casts are the first options for their roles.

About Gu Yaodong, Many people wondered how could he persuaded a top star like Li Yifeng to take on the greenhorn policeman role. He said that he had to talk to Li Yifeng twice before Li Yifeng accepted the role. Gu Yaodong is the protagonist but has no aura of the protagonist. He is not as smart as the other spy war drama's protagonists. Gu Yaodong is a normal person but every character is related to him. Over 1,300 scenes belong to him. Makes this role extraordinary. The actor who takes on this role has to play charmingly. He has to be charming enough to make the audience feel Gu Yaodong's cuteness and won't make the role annoying. So Wang Wei needed an actor who could attract the audiences to stay tuned to see the protagonist's developments. Li Yifeng is very capable.

About Xia Jicheng, Wang Wei and Wang Longzheng have worked together in "Evil Minds" and "Day and Night (TV series)". In Wang Wei's opinion, Wang Longzheng is a neat actor, a professional one. He once said "Wang Longzheng is an actor I love in all aspects. He is different from the role he took. I know him and know what he can bring to the role.

About Shen Qinghe, At first, Wang Wei had no actress in mind, until Li Yifeng recommended Gina Jin to him. He agreed with Li Yifeng that she is suitable for the role. Gina Jin once said that she felt really grateful to Li Yifeng for his recommendation. Because she had problems with her agency at that time and had no job for 9 months. It had been really difficult for her till she got this role.

Receptions 
The series was praised for its tightly woven plot, production quality, and acting performance. Achieved High scores from many sites; Douban 8.2 points, Zhihu 9.1, Tencent 9.3 The series was Top 1 drama with the highest rating during the broadcast. and was in the Top 10 of 2020 Douban highest-rated dramas.

Li Yifeng ranked 1st in November VLinkage actor chart; followed by Gina Jin 16th and Wang Longzheng 22nd

In Datawin 2020 list, Fearless Whispers arrived 1st in the period drama chart. Li Yifeng also crowned the 1st place of period drama actors; followed by Gina Jin in 8th place.

From all success, the series has been rerun 7 times in a month after the first-round broadcast and had been rerun 101 times till now (March, 2022).

Ratings 

 Highest ratings are marked in red, lowest ratings are marked in blue

Soundtracks

Awards and nominations

Broadcasting

References 

Chinese drama television series
Chinese period television series
Chinese television series
2020 Chinese television series debuts
2020 Chinese television series endings
Chinese historical television series
Chinese action television series